Muhammad Ajward Macan Markar, FRCP is a Sri Lankan physician, academic. He was the first Professor of Medicine at the University of Ceylon, Peradeniya.

Born to Sir Mohamed Macan Markar, he was educated at Royal College Colombo, where he played cricket for the college at the Royal-Thomian. Macan Markar went on to study medicine at the University of Ceylon, where he also represented the university at cricket. Graduating with a MBBS and winning the gold medal for in obstetrics and gynaecology, he went on to gain MBBS and M.D. from the University of London and MRCP by 1952. He is a Fellow of the Royal College of Physicians.

He was the younger brother of Ahmed Hussain Macan Markar.

References

Sri Lankan obstetricians
Alumni of Royal College, Colombo
Alumni of the University of Ceylon (Colombo)
Alumni of the University of London
Living people
Fellows of the Royal College of Physicians
Academic staff of the University of Ceylon (Peradeniya)
Year of birth missing (living people)